Bob Stewart (born 9 August 1946) is a former Australian rules footballer who played with Melbourne in the Victorian Football League (VFL).

Notes

External links 

Demonwiki profile

1946 births
Living people
Australian rules footballers from Victoria (Australia)
Melbourne Football Club players